The 2016–17 College of Charleston Cougars men's basketball team represented the College of Charleston during the 2015–16 NCAA Division I men's basketball season. The Cougars were led by third-year head coach Earl Grant and played their home games at the TD Arena as members of the Colonial Athletic Association. They finished the season 25–10, 14–4 in CAA play to finish in second place. They defeated James Madison and Towson to advance to the championship game of the CAA tournament where they lost to UNC Wilmington. They received an invitation to the National Invitation Tournament where they lost in the first round to Colorado State.

Previous season
The Cougars finished the 2015–16 season 17–14, 8–10 in CAA play to finish in seventh place. They advanced to the quarterfinals of the CAA tournament where they lost to UNC Wilmington.

Departures

Recruiting

Roster

Schedule and results

|-
!colspan=9 style=| Exhibition

|-
!colspan=9 style=| Non-Conference regular season

|-
!colspan=9 style=| CAA regular season

|-
!colspan=9 style=| CAA tournament

|-
!colspan=9 style=| NIT

References 

College of Charleston Cougars men's basketball seasons
College Of Charleston
College of Charleston
Charleston
Charleston